Matěj Sebera (born May 15, 2001) is a Czech professional ice hockey forward. He is currently playing for HC ZUBR Přerov in the Chance Liga on loan from PSG Berani Zlín.

Sebera has been a member of Zlín's academy since 2014 and made his senior debut for the team during the 2020–21 Czech Extraliga season. In September 2020, Sebera was sent on loan to HC ZUBR Přerov of the Chance Liga. He also had a loan spell with SHK Hodonín of the 2.liga during the 2019–20 season.

References

External links

2001 births
Living people
Czech ice hockey forwards
SHK Hodonín players
HC ZUBR Přerov players
Sportspeople from Zlín
PSG Berani Zlín players